A. darwini may refer to:

 Acarterus darwini
 Actia darwini, a tachinid fly species
 Amasa darwini
 Amblyomma darwini
 Anastatus darwini
 Anaulacomera darwini
 Aniksosaurus darwini, a dinosaur species from what is now Chubut Province, Argentina
 Aprostocetus darwini
 Apteronemobius darwini
 Atropos darwini, a synonym for Trimeresurus strigatus, a venomous pitviper species found in southern India

See also 
 A. darwinii (disambiguation)
 Darwini (disambiguation)